Mar Jacob Angadiath
(born September 26, 1945) is an Indian prelate of the Catholic Church; he was serving as the first bishop of the St. Thomas Syro-Malabar Catholic Diocese of Chicago from July 2001 until his retirement on July 3, 2022.

Biography
 
Angadiath  was born on October 26, 1945 at Periappuram in the princely state of Cochin (modern day Ernakulam District, Kerala) in India. He was sent to Dallas, Texas, in 1984 under the auspices of the Overseas Mission of the Syro-Malabar Church to initiate a Syro-Malabar ministry in the United States.

See also
 

 Catholic Church hierarchy
 Catholic Church in the United States
 Historical list of the Catholic bishops of the United States
 List of Catholic bishops of the United States
 Lists of patriarchs, archbishops, and bishops

Episcopal succession

References

External links
Syro-Malabar Catholic Eparchy of St. Thomas of Chicago Official Site

1945 births
Living people
Indian emigrants to the United States
Syro-Malabar bishops
Eastern Catholic bishops in the United States
21st-century Eastern Catholic bishops